A four-point shot (also called a four-pointer) is a shot in a basketball game made from a part of the court designated for a four-point shot. The designated area is typically farther from the basket than the three-point arc. A successful attempt is worth four points, in contrast to the three points awarded for a shot beyond the three-point line, two points awarded for shots made within the three-point line and the one point for each made free throw. 

The four-pointer was introduced in competition by the Harlem Globetrotters.  The Big3 basketball league is the only professional league that uses the four-point field goal. In BIG3, there are three distinct circles beyond the three-point arc designated as a four-point shot area. A four-point shot is attempted when a player shoots with any part of the player's body touching any part of the four-point circle.

Footnotes

Further reading

 Mike Coppinger, "Going Deep: Harlem Globetrotters Add a Four Point Line," USA Today, Sept. 22, 2016.
 Jordan Ellenberg and Josh Levin, "The 4 Point Line Could Be Coming to the NBA, Here's Where to Put It," Slate.com/ June 20, 2016.
 Victor Mather, "New Three-on-Three League Has 4-Point Shot, Allen Iverson," New York Times, Jan. 11, 2017.
 Kevin Nye, "The Real Answer to the NBA 4-Point Line Debate," Hashtag Basketball, Mar. 13, 2019.

Rules of basketball
Basketball terminology
Harlem Globetrotters